The Pöstlingberg is a  high hill on the left bank of the Danube in the city of Linz, Austria. It is a popular tourist destination, with a viewing platform over the city, and is the site of the Pöstlingberg pilgrimage church, and the Linz Grottenbahn.

The Pöstlingberg is reached from the city centre by line 50 of the Linz tramway, running over the Pöstlingbergbahn mountain tramway.

Bibliography 
 Erich Hillbrand, Friederike Grill-Hillbrand: Pöstlingberg. Streiflichter auf Erscheinungsbild und Geschichte des Linzer Hausbergs. Universitätsverlag Rudolf Trauner, Linz 1996, 
 Christian Hager: Auf den Pöstlingberg! Geschichte und Geschichten vom Wahrzeichen der Landeshauptstadt Linz. Verlag Denkmayr, Linz 1997,

External links 
 

Linz
Hills of Austria
Tourist attractions in Linz
Landforms of Upper Austria